The Swimming competition at the 22nd SEA Games was held from 1 to 10 December 2003 in My Dinh Aquatics Centre, Hanoi, Vietnam. The competition featured 32 events (16 male, 16 female) swum in a long course (50m) pool.

Medal summary

Medal table 
Key
 Host nation (Vietnam)

Medalists
Men's events

Women's events

References

2003 Southeast Asian Games events
2003 in swimming
2003
Aquatics at the 2003 Southeast Asian Games